The Silver Cross of Rhodesia was Rhodesia's second-highest military decoration for conspicuous gallantry.

It was the equivalent of the Distinguished Service Order, Distinguished Conduct Medal and Conspicuous Gallantry Medal, with all ranks eligible.

Institution

The award was instituted in 1970 by Presidential Warrant, the first awards being made in 1974. The last awards were made in June 1980.

Medal

The medal was a sterling silver cross with an enamelled roundel in the centre bearing a lion's head, suspended from a ribbon woven half-red and half blue, with green edges and narrow white stripes at the inner edge of the green. The medal was impressed in small capitals with the recipient's name on the reverse, and was awarded with a case of issue, miniature medal for wear, and an illuminated certificate.

Recipients

A total of 34 awards of the Silver Cross of Rhodesia were made, two posthumously. Notable recipients included Martin Pearse, who was killed in Lusaka in 1979 during the attempted assassination by the Rhodesian SAS of the ZAPU insurgent leader Joshua Nkomo. Recipients were entitled to the post-nominal letters SCR.

Zimbabwe

The Silver Cross of Rhodesia was superseded in October 1980 by the Silver Cross of Zimbabwe, which is also awarded for conspicuous bravery, but which is open for award to civilians as well as military personnel.

Notes

References

Pittaway, J, and Fourie, C., 2003. SAS Rhodesia, Dandy Agencies, South Africa. 
Saffery, D., 2006. The Rhodesia Medal Roll, Jeppestown Press, United Kingdom.

External links

Orders, Medals and Decorations of Zimbabwe
SAS Recipients

Military awards and decorations of Rhodesia
Courage awards
1970 establishments in Rhodesia
1980 disestablishments in Zimbabwe
Awards established in 1970